Roger Fritz (22 September 1936 – 26 November 2021) was a German actor, director, producer and photographer, perhaps best known for Cross of Iron, and his work with Rainer Werner Fassbinder in Querelle, Lili Marleen and Berlin Alexanderplatz.

Roger Fritz was born on 22 September 1936 in Mannheim, Baden, Germany. He was married to the actress, Helga Anders (1948–1986), from 1968 to 1974, when they divorced. They had one child, Leslie Fritz, who is an assistant director.

Selected filmography
Director
  (1967)
  (1968), Anthology film, segment Sybille
  (Häschen in der Grube, 1969)
  (1970)
 Motiv Liebe (1972, TV series)
  (1981)

Actor
 ...und noch frech dazu! (1960, directed by Rolf von Sydow) - Michael
  (1960, directed by Frank Wisbar) - Fähnrich Andreas
  (1968, directed by Eckhart Schmidt) - Raoul Malsen
  (1968, directed by ) - Roger
 Bis zum Happy-End (1968, directed by ) - Paul
 Carnal Circuit (1969, directed by Alberto De Martino) - Giulio Lamberti
 Lovemaker (1969, directed by Ugo Liberatore) - Klaus
 Kompanie der Knallköppe (1971, directed by Rolf Olsen) - Heinz von Kattnig
  (1972, directed by Rudolf Thome) - Philipp Kramer / Franz Lerchenfeld
  (1972, TV miniseries, directed by Mario Landi) - Pietro Rusconi
 Cross of Iron (1977, directed by Sam Peckinpah) - Leutnant (Lt.) Triebig
 Despair (1978, directed by Rainer Werner Fassbinder) - Inspector Braun
 Berlin Alexanderplatz (1980, TV miniseries, directed by Rainer Werner Fassbinder) - Herbert Virchow
 Lili Marleen (1981, directed by Rainer Werner Fassbinder) - Kauffmann
 Querelle (1982, directed by Rainer Werner Fassbinder) - Marcellin
 Ich bin dein Killer (1982, directed by Jochen Richter) - Manager Didi
  (1984, directed by Burkhard Driest) - Micha
  (1984, directed by Eckhart Schmidt) - Franz
 Der Havarist (1984, directed by Wolf-Eckart Bühler)
  (1984, directed by Dieter Pröttel)
 Ich schenk dir die Sterne (1991, directed by Jörg Graser)
 Daniel – Der Zauberer (2004, directed by Ulli Lommel) - Producer (final film role)

Producer
  (1968, directed by Eckhart Schmidt)
 Madame Bovary (1969, directed by Hans Schott-Schöbinger)

References

External links
 

1936 births
2021 deaths
Mass media people from Mannheim
German male film actors
20th-century German male actors